Allocnemis mitwabae is a species of damselfly in the family Platycnemididae. It is endemic to the Democratic Republic of the Congo.  Its natural habitat is rivers. It is threatened by habitat loss.

References

Fauna of the Democratic Republic of the Congo
Platycnemididae
Insects described in 1961
Endemic fauna of the Democratic Republic of the Congo
Taxonomy articles created by Polbot